Edward Gordon Smith (15 June 1857 – 30 May 1906) was a British postcard publisher.

His father was listed in the 1881 census as "Fancy Goods Warehouseman & Photographer Master Employing 7 men and 4 women."

Smith began publishing postcards of London in 1903, based at 68 Allerton Road, Stoke Newington. In 1905, he moved to 15 Stroud Green Road, Finsbury Park, London, and expanded into Essex and Hertfordshire.

Smith died in 1906, and his wife Elizabeth and daughters Dorothy and Ethel continued the business until about 1916.

References

External links

1857 births
1906 deaths
Postcard publishers